Manuel Pietropoli (born 30 April 1990 in Desenzano del Garda) is an Italian snowboarder. He competed in the men's halfpipe event at the 2006 Winter Olympics, placing 43rd, and at the 2010 Winter Olympics, placing 39th.

References

1990 births
Living people
Italian male snowboarders
Olympic snowboarders of Italy
Snowboarders at the 2006 Winter Olympics
Snowboarders at the 2010 Winter Olympics
21st-century Italian people